Anthony Higgins (born 3 June 1954) is a Scottish former professional footballer.

Club career
During his career Higgins played for Hibernian, Partick Thistle, Greenock Morton and Stranraer. He played for Hibernian in the marathon 1979 Scottish Cup Final.

Other work
After retiring as a player, Higgins became chairman of the Scottish Professional Footballers' Association. He left that position in 2006 to become the Scottish representative of FIFPro, the international footballers' union, though as of 2021 he was also still president of PFA Scotland acting in an advisory capacity.

He also occasionally appears as a pundit on the BBC Scotland football programme Sportscene.

References

External links 

1954 births
Living people
Scottish footballers
Hibernian F.C. players
Partick Thistle F.C. players
Greenock Morton F.C. players
Stranraer F.C. players
Scottish Football League players
Association football midfielders
Footballers from Glasgow
Scottish sports executives and administrators
Scottish chief executives
Scottish trade unionists
Presidents of British trade unions